The 1923 Leeds Central by-election was a parliamentary by-election for the British House of Commons constituency of Leeds Central on 26 July 1923.

Vacancy
The by-election was caused by the death of the sitting Unionist MP, Arthur Wellesley Willey on 2 July 1923. He had been MP here since winning the seat in 1922.

Electoral history
Willey had gained the seat from the Liberals at the previous general election;

Result
The Unionists held the seat. The Liberal share was halved with the Labour party picking up that former Liberal vote.

Aftermath
The result at the following General election;

References

Leeds Central by-election
Elections in Leeds
History of Leeds
Leeds Central by-election
Leeds Central by-election
1920s in Leeds
By-elections to the Parliament of the United Kingdom in Yorkshire and the Humber constituencies